Hedda may refer to:

Arts, entertainment, and media
 Hedda Award, a Norwegian theatre award
 Hedda Gabler (1890), a play by Henrik Ibsen
 Hedda (film), 1975 film based on the play

People with the given name
 Hedda Østberg Amundsen (born 1998), Norwegian cross-country skier
Hedda Anderson (1832–1912), Swedish writer, teacher, and school founder
Hedda Andersson (1861–1950), Swedish physician
Hedda Berntsen (born 1976), Norwegian skier
Hedda Bolgar (1909–2013), American psychoanalyst
Hedda Dyson (1897–1951), Netherlands-born New Zealand journalist and magazine editor
Hedda Eulenberg (1876–1960), German translator and writer
Hedda von Fersen (1753–1792), Swedish countess and courtier
Hedda Strand Gardsjord (born 1982), Norwegian footballer
 Hedda Hjortsberg (1777–1867), Swedish ballerina
 Hedda Hopper (1885–1966),  American actress and columnist
Hedda Hynne (born 1990), Norwegian middle-distance runner
Hedd Korsch (1890–1982), German-American educationalist and university professor
 Hedda Lettuce, American drag queen, comedian and singer
Hedda Lundh (1921–2012), Danish resistance fighter, journalist and schoolteacher
Hedda Morrison (1908–1991), German-Australian photographer
Hedda Nova (1899–1981), Russian-born American film actress
Hedda Nussbaum (born 1942), American author
Hedda Piper (1746–1812), Swedish courtier
Hedda zu Putlitz (born 1965), German cyclist at the 2000 Olympics
Hedda Stiernstedt (born 1987), Swedish actress
 Hedda Sterne (1910–2011), Romanian-born American artist
Hedda Vernon (1888–1925), German actress, screenwriter, and film producer
Hedda Wardemann, German immunologist
Hedda Wrangel (1792–1833, Swedish composer
Hedda Zinner (1905–1994), German political writer, actress, comedian, journalist and radio director
Hedda Ødegaard (born 1995), Norwegian tennis player

Other uses 

 207 Hedda, an asteroid

See also 

 Hædde (d. 705), Bishop of Winchester, saint

is:Hedda
no:Hedda